Francesco Carpenetti (born 4 October 1942) is a retired Italian professional football player.

He played for 8 seasons (142 games, 3 goals) in the Serie A for A.S. Roma and ACF Fiorentina.

Honours
 Coppa Italia winner: 1968/69.

External links
Profile at Almanaccogiallorosso.it

1942 births
Living people
Italian footballers
Serie A players
A.S. Roma players
ACF Fiorentina players
F.C. Grosseto S.S.D. players
Association football defenders
Istrian Italian people
People from Primorje-Gorski Kotar County